Crotalaria mentiens is a species of plant in the family Fabaceae. It is found only in Cameroon. Its natural habitats are subtropical or tropical dry forests and subtropical or tropical dry lowland grassland. It is threatened by habitat loss.

References

mentiens
Flora of Cameroon
Endangered plants
Taxonomy articles created by Polbot